Brinsop Court, Brinsop, Herefordshire, England is a manor house dating from the 14th century. The house was much extended in the 16th and 17th centuries, and reconstructed in the early 20th century by Henry Avray Tipping. Brinsop contains many period features including fireplaces, ceilings and wooden panelling. The house is surrounded by lawns, encircled by a moat and stands within an 800-acre estate. It remains privately owned and is now primarily used as an events venue.

History
The Old Court at Brinsop was built in the early fourteenth century by a local squire, and was grander than a similar manor across the county at Cheyney Longville, which was owned by a knight and member of parliament. An ancient manuscript mentions that a moat round and approached by a drawbridge; within the quadrangle was a Chapel and a crypt beneath it, a dungeon and a blacksmith's forge.  The Chapel, with the staircase leading to it, occupied one side of the square; it had a groined roof and walls painted in frescoes.... Two towers flanked the drawbridge, having grotesque figures on their tops - one being a monkey playing with a fiddle.  In the inner court was a third tower, which though in a perfect state of preservation, was pulled down about fifty years ago to assist in building a wall round the stables.

The first historical mention of Brinsop post-dates the Credenhill Iron Age fort. Brinsop is also an affluent or minor tributary of the River Wye. Tradition records that at the time of medieval settlement of the land at Brinsop in around 1210 a knight called St George slayed a dragon on the spot where the church was founded.  Ralph's son Ralph also lived at Brinsop and confirmed the charter grant. Sir Roger was knighted by Edward I for fighting against his enemies during the Welsh Wars from 1282 onwards.  The third Ralph died without an heir, his sister therefore inheriting.  She brought Brinsop in her dower to husband, Adam Lucas in 1305.  In 1340 the King Edward III allowed a reversion charter to Ralph Tirell of 240 acres in fee for military service - de Domino Herberto filio Petri - a tenants of Lord Herbert.

It was mentioned in Edward Mogg's 16th edition of Paterson's Roads (1822), when it was owned by Dansey Richard Dansey. The Dansey family owned the house for 500 years before it died out in the early nineteenth century. The stained glass in the church celebrates a visit by Charles I to the house in 1645, which is confirmed by the differenced arms of the Danseys with the ducal families of Chandos, Talbot, and Baskerville. After the king's defeat the Danseys were compounded by parliament for £390.  Their grandson, Colonel Richard Dansey was a soldier in Marlborough's campaigns fighting at the Battle of Almanza.  The house was slighted to some extent, the remainder falling into ruins during the antiquarian period of the eighteenth century when it was the habit to loot the stone of ramshackle buildings.

In 1817 the house was purchased for £26,000 by the economist David Ricardo of Gatcombe Park, who was buying a number of estates at the time, not least Bromsberrow Place, situated above the Severn at the point where the three counties intersected.  Ricardo leased Brinsop to Thomas Hutchinson, brother-in-law of William Wordsworth. Wordsworth visited the house from December 1827 to January 1828, and wrote three of his sonnets in that time. His sister, Dorothy Wordsworth, wrote of Brinsop Court that it was no cheerless spot, and flowers in the hedges and blossoms in the numerous orchards will soon make it gay. Our fireside is enlivened by four fine, well-managed children, and cheerful friends; Mrs. Hutchinson is one of the most pleasing and excellent of women.... Hutchinson's sister Sara Hutchinson, a former lover of Samuel Taylor Coleridge, also stayed there with the friends. From 1845 Dearman Edwards occupied the building as a tenant farmer purchasing it at the end of his life in 1909, when it was sold.

From 1912 the house was owned by Captain Philip Astley.  He commissioned Henry Avray Tipping to completely modernise the design of the place into a full square by adding the east wing which was completed in 1913.  They upgraded the outbuildings  and extended the gardens to a working farm.  During the 1930s, Astley brought his new wife, the actress and socialite Madeleine Carroll to live at the house, whose friends and guests included Noël Coward.

At the end of World War II the house was occupied by La Retraite school. After the Second World War Sir Derrick Bailey owned the house. Brinsop Court has been owned by Martin and Pat Churchward since 2005 and is now primarily an events venue.

Architecture and description
Brinsop Court is a Grade I listed building. The bridge across the moat is listed Grade II.

Arms 
 Quarterly, 1 and 4, Barry wavy of six argent, and gules
Dansey; 2 Azure, on a cross argent 5 escallops gules
Cricketoft; 3 Or, three bars dancette gules
Delamere

Ancestry

Notes

References

Sources
 

Grade I listed buildings in Herefordshire
Country houses in Herefordshire